La Riviera is a village in the Rocha Department of Uruguay.

References 

Populated places in the Rocha Department